Drala Mountain Center (formerly known as Shambhala Mountain Center) is a spiritual retreat center located on 600 acres in a valley in the northern Colorado Rocky Mountains. The original center on this land was founded by Chögyam Trungpa Rinpoche in 1971 at Red Feather Lakes, Colorado.

The center is one of several retreat centers affiliated with Shambhala, a global Buddhist community of predominantly Western students that has been in crisis in recent years due to multiple credible allegations of sexual misconduct against its leader, and public revelations of an institutional history of ongoing abuse.

History
Trungpa arrived in Boulder, Colorado, in 1970 with a number of students from Tail of the Tiger in Barnet, Vermont, now known as Karmê Chöling. Students from neighboring towns and across the country became part of the Karma Dzong Meditation Center in Boulder. Trungpa's growing umbrella organization was called Vajradhatu. The land for what was then called Rocky Mountain Dharma center was purchased for Trungpa with money from a donor. A band of hippies who called themselves the Pygmies built the first rough structures and inhabited the land as a commune, and the first dathun (intensive meditation instruction) was held there in the summer of 1974. Improvements were made over the next decades and more structures built, to create the capacity for year-round programs.

In 1987, Trungpa died of illnesses related to his long-term alcohol abuse. He was 47. A series of leadership changes that followed impacted the Rocky Mountain Dharma Center.  After Trungpa's death, Vajra Regent Ösel Tendzin became spiritual head of Vajradhatu until around 1989. Citing an AIDS-related infection, allegations arose that Tendzin had passed HIV to a male partner in the Colorado congregation, who in turn unknowingly infected his female partner. Tendzin, who was HIV-positive, knowingly had sex with students for three years without disclosing his infection. He had a delusion that his enlightened status protected himself and others from AIDS. It eventually came out that the Vajradhatu board of directors had known of the problem for more than two years and had done nothing about it.

After the death of Ösel Tendzin in 1990, Trungpa's son, Ösel Rangdröl Mukpo became head of the organization. In 1995, Ösel Rangdröl Mukpo was enthroned as Sakyong Mipham Rinpoche, a chögyal, or "dharma king," who holds and propagates the teachings of Shambhala. The name of Rocky Mountain Dharma center was changed to Rocky Mountain Shambhala Center sometime in the 1990s.

In the 2000s, after Sakyong Mipham started the process of enclosing the previously secular teachings of Shambhala within the container of a new buddhist lineage, Shambhala Buddhism, the name of the center was changed again, to Shambhala Mountain Center.

In 2018, Sakyong Mipham was accused of multiple counts of sexual misconduct and abuse of power and temporarily stepped back from teaching (see Controversy section).

In September 2020, several structures at the Shambhala Mountain Center were lost in the Cameron Peak fire.

In February 2022, the center changed its name to Drala Mountain Center, after the Tibetan Buddhist term drala which roughly translates to "energy beyond aggression."

On February 28, 2022 Drala Mountain Center filed for Chapter 11 bankruptcy protection, citing the 2018 clergy sexual misconduct scandal, the Cameron Peak Fire and COVID-19 as contributing factors.

Location
The property is located in the Red Feather Lakes area on 600 acres (2.4 km2) in the foothills west of Fort Collins. The center has  of building space for meditation, dharma talks, programs, and lodging.

Programs
The center hosts Shambhala Training meditation programs as well as yoga instruction, leadership training, children's programs, and various longer term retreats.

The Great Stupa of Dharmakaya
After the death of Trungpa in 1987, his followers began a fourteen-year process of building a stupa at the Shambhala Mountain Center. Consecrated in August 2001, The Great Stupa of Dharmakaya is 108 feet (33 m) tall. It is noted on the Stupa and is common knowledge among Shambhala practitioners who  have visited center that Trungpa's relics are permanently entombed in the stupa following Tibetan Buddhist tradition.

Controversy
Since 2018, multiple reports of clergy sexual misconduct and power abuse by the head of Shambhala, Sakyong Mipham Rinpoche, as well as other current and former Shambhala teachers, have led to an institutional crisis for the global Shambhala organization and its land centers, including Shambhala Mountain Center. Some of the abuse was alleged to have taken place at the Shambhala Mountain Center, where leadership was alleged to have suppressed prior allegations of abuse. Third party reports have verified the credibility of the allegations. The Larimer County Sheriff's Office opened up an investigation of allegations of sexual abuse involving minors. Sakyong Mipham temporarily suspended teaching, left the country and moved to Nepal, and stepped back from the leadership activity of Shambhala, while retaining his title, position, and authority. He subsequently resumed teaching, both within and outside of the Shambhala organization.  In 2020, fresh reports of inappropriate sexual behavior towards female college students by a teacher at Shambhala Mountain Center during a course which took place that winter caused Chapman University to suspend its usual courses there. In September 2020, an investigative report detailed a culture of abuse dating back to early days of the Shambhala Buddhist organization.

References

External links
 Shambhala Mountain Center

Asian-American culture in Colorado
Buddhism in Colorado
Buildings and structures in Larimer County, Colorado
Education in Larimer County, Colorado
Tourist attractions in Larimer County, Colorado
Religious buildings and structures in Colorado
Tibetan Buddhism in the United States
Companies that filed for Chapter 11 bankruptcy in 2022